The United States Air Force's 628th Air Base Wing is an administrative unit located at Joint Base Charleston, in North Charleston, South Carolina. The 628 ABW was activated on 8 January 2010 as Charleston Air Force Base was merged with Naval Weapons Station Charleston as a result of changes after Base Realignment and Closure Commission recommendations.

Naval Support Activity Charleston was reorganized as an "Embedded Military Unit" within the Joint Base Charleston 628 ABW. NSA Charleston Navy personnel are embedded into the Air Base Wing installation support squadrons to carry out their functions.  After the creation of the Joint Base, the Naval Support Activity Charleston Commanding Officer became the Deputy Commander of the 628th Air Base Wing, responsible to the Wing Commander for base installation support.

The wing provides support services such as housing and facilities maintenance, security, childcare, public works, safety, communications, finance, logistics, medical support, personnel, public affairs, legal, food service, contracts, and recreation.

The 628th Air Base Wing's primary duties are to provide installation support to 53 Department of Defense and Federal agencies, supporting a total force of over 79,000 airmen, sailors, soldiers, marines, coast guardsmen, civilians, dependents and retirees on Charleston AFB and Naval Weapons Station Charleston.  It maintains $2.0 billion worth of physical infrastructure across 23,000 non-contiguous acres. They also provide expeditionary airmen to combatant commanders in support of joint and combined operations.

Lineage
 Constituted as the 628th Air Base Wing
 Activated on 8 January 2010

Assignments
 Eighteenth Air Force, 8 January 2010
 United States Air Force Expeditionary Center, 1 January 2011 – present

Components
 628th Mission Support Group, 8 January 2010 – present
 628th Medical Group, 8 January 2010 – present
 628th Comptroller Squadron, 8 January 2010 – present

References

Military units and formations in South Carolina
0628
Military units and formations established in 2010